Ira Hough (July 2, 1842 – October 18, 1916) was a Union Army soldier during the American Civil War. He received the Medal of Honor for gallantry when he captured an enemy flag during the Battle of Cedar Creek fought near Middletown, Virginia on October 19, 1864. The battle was the decisive engagement of Major General Philip Sheridan's Valley Campaigns of 1864 and was the largest battle fought in the Shenandoah Valley.

Hough joined the army from Middletown, Indiana in May 1864, and was discharged in August 1865.

Medal of Honor citation
The President of the United States of America, in the name of Congress, takes pleasure in presenting the Medal of Honor to Private Ira Hough, United States Army, for extraordinary heroism on 19 October 1864, while serving with Company E, 8th Indiana Infantry, in action at Cedar Creek, Virginia, for capture of flag.

See also

List of Medal of Honor recipients
List of American Civil War Medal of Honor recipients: G-L

References

External links
Military Times Hall of Valor
Findagrave entry

1842 births
1916 deaths
People from Henry County, Indiana
People of Indiana in the American Civil War
People of Florida in the American Civil War
Union Army soldiers
United States Army Medal of Honor recipients
American Civil War recipients of the Medal of Honor